"It's a Fine Day" is a song written by English poet and musician Edward Barton. It was originally recorded a cappella in 1983 by Jane and later by Opus III, for whom it was a major international hit in 1992.

Original recording by Jane

Barton wrote the lyrics as a poem when living in the Hulme area of Manchester. It was originally sung unaccompanied by, and credited to, Jane – that is, Jane Lancaster, Barton's girlfriend.  They recorded and released it independently, and it was played by radio DJ John Peel. It was then heard by Iain McNay of Cherry Red Records, who obtained the rights to the record and released it more widely on his label in 1983.
It reached number 5 on the UK Indie Chart, and later appeared, credited to Jane and Barton, on their eponymous mini-album, Jane and Barton.
This version of the song appeared on the 2013 indie-pop compilation album, Scared to Get Happy: A Story of Indie-Pop 1980–1989.

Jane's unaccompanied vocal version of the song was given a backing track by A Guy Called Gerald in 1992.

Charts

Opus III version

In 1992, "It's a Fine Day" was covered by English electronic music group Opus III, whose lead vocalist was Kirsty Hawkshaw. It was their debut and released as the first single from their album, Mind Fruit (1992). The single reached number five in the United Kingdom, and number-one in Greece and on the US Billboard Hot Dance Club Play chart. In 2010, the song was named the 182nd best track of the 1990s by Pitchfork Media. The two chief differences from Jane's original were that this version was not recorded a cappella but with a full instrumental accompaniment, and that it used only the chorus of the original song's lyrics.

Background
At the time of the release, the producers behind the British dance sensation couldn't legally reveal themselves. There was a story being told around how the group was formed. Supposedly the producers had stumbled on classically-trained vocalist Kirsty Hawkshaw, hearing her sing while they were recording the sounds of birds in the Hertfordshire woods to a sample for a new track.

Chart performance
"It's a Fine Day" went on to become very successful on the charts in Europe, peaking at number-one in Greece and number two in Spain. It entered the top 10 also in Finland (10), Ireland (6), Italy (9), and the United Kingdom. In the latter, the single reached number five in its second week on the UK Singles Chart, on February 23, 1992. It spent two weeks at that position and ended up as number 60 on the UK Year-end chart. On the UK Dance Singles Chart, it was even more successful, reaching number three. "It's a Fine Day" was a top 20 hit in Austria (14), France (14), Germany (18) and on the Eurochart Hot 100, where it peaked at number 16 in March 1992. And a top 30 hit in Belgium (24), Sweden (22) and Switzerland (24).

Outside Europe, the song peaked at number eight in Israel and soared to the number-one position on the US Billboard Hot Dance Club Play chart, while reaching number 12 on the Billboard Dance Singles Sales chart and number 30 on the Billboard Modern Rock Tracks chart. In Australia, the single reached the top 60, peaking at number 54.

Critical reception
Larry Flick from Billboard felt the "quirky dance act" has made a "near-perfect, radio-friendly ditty", noting that it's "empowered with a potent blend of, ethereal female vocals, a hypnotic hook, and an electro-hip beat." Andy Kastanas from The Charlotte Observer declared it as "a dance-pop tune with "rave" undertones and pretty female vocals that'll make your day better than fine." Marisa Fox from Entertainment Weekly described it as a "bubble-gummy dance track", adding that "this self-described ambient-techno group lives up to the genre’s esoteric side." Dave Sholin from Gavin Report replied on the circulating story around the group, "A likely story. In any case, it was a fortunate meeting that gave life to this hot track." Dave Simpson from Melody Maker complimented it as "a masterstroke in conception and execution", stating that "in five years' time, anyone searching for the sound and spirit of early '92 won't be far from "It's a Fine Day'"."

Alan Jones from Music Week found that "it's the nearest thing yet to an ambient rave. Watch it chase Kylie and 2 Unlimited up the chart." Wendi Cermak from The Network Forty wrote, "Like nothing else out there, this track is simultaneously spacey and driving, bordering on the current Euro-rave movement." Danny Scott from Select remarked its "surreal ambient house sounds". Seamus Quinn from NME said, "Believe me when I tell you that this will be a monster hit. It's also a very odd record. It combines an element of Temper Temper's "It's All Outta Loving You" with deliciously dreamy female vocals and a thumping rhythm track." He concluded, "A winner." Another editor, Stephen Dalton, felt it's "the sound of spring arriving early. You'll love it." And Roger Morton declared it as "a seductive piece of lightweight house, which takes Crystal Waters style breezy beats and nursery school melodies, and showers them with blossom and balloons." Andy Beevers from the RM Dance Update called it "one of the year's most unusual hits." Mark Frith from Smash Hits gave it two out of five, but stated that it "has become something of a dance anthem."

Retrospective response
AllMusic editor MacKenzie Wilson said the song is "melodically enchanting with loopy trance vibes and textured synth waves", noting Kirsty Hawkshaw's "dove-like vocals transcended into freewheeling soundscapes". In 1999, Tom Ewing of Freaky Trigger called it a "precious lullaby for a sleepless generation." In 2010, "It's a Fine Day" was ranked number 182 in Pitchfork Medias list of "The Top 200 Tracks of the 1990s".

Music video
The accompanying music video for "It's a Fine Day" was directed by David Betteridge. It first aired in February 1992. The video features Kirsty Hawkshaw with her standout shaved head and bodysuit, performing and dancing against a backdrop of what is supposed to be a fine day.

Track listings

 7-inch single "It's a Fine Day" (edit) – 3:40
 "Evolution Rush" (edit) – 4:21

 12-inch maxi "It's a Fine Day" (club remix) – 6:45
 "It's a Fine Day" (club remix) – 6:45

 CD single'''
 "It's a Fine Day" (edit) – 3:40
 "It's a Fine Day" – 5:30
 "Evolution Rush" – 6:11
 "It's a Fine Day" (a cappella version) – 3:42

Charts

Weekly charts

Year-end charts

Later versions

The song was also the basis of Orbital's 1993 track, "Halcyon + On + On", on their second eponymous album – the "la la la" section of the chorus was backmasked and sampled throughout the song. Interestingly enough, a music video for the song featured Hawkshaw, who was the aforementioned vocalist in the song’s sample.

A Cantonese-language version of this single, "Can lalalalali at night only," was recorded by Hong Kong singer Yolinda Yan in 1992.

A further version was released in 1998, credited to Miss Jane.  This was produced by Italian producers David Carlotti and Carmine Sorrentino.  The remake does feature vocals from the original Jane version. Luise Gard provided the on-stage image for the touring version of Miss Jane, but did not contribute to the recordings.  Various remixes of this version were issued, including one by ATB.

Other versions have been recorded by Dallas Superstars and the Barcode Brothers.  Norwegian artist Erlend Øye also covered the song on his album that was part of the DJ-Kicks series.

Opus III vocalist Kirsty Hawkshaw has remade the song three times: in 2002 with Mike Koglin, in 2008 with Kinky Roland, and in 2019 as “Fine Day 2K19.”

The American electropop/hip-hop act Far East Movement used the song's background as the basis for their single "I Party" from their 2009 album "Animal."

Hardcore producer The Genesis Projection sampled the song in their 2008 track "World Grid".

Animal Collective member Avey Tare sampled the song's vocals on Oliver Twist'', a song from his 2010 solo album Down There.

The Jane version was used in a 1986 commercial for Kleenex tissue in Japan, which itself has attracted attention as a Japanese urban legend.

British Singer-Songwriter Billie Marten included a cover of the song in the deluxe version of her 2016 album "Writings of Blues and Yellows"

German house producer and DJ Keanu Silva sampled the song in his track also titled "Fine Day" in July 2018. It has reached over 3 million views on YouTube.

References

1983 songs
1983 singles
1992 debut singles
Opus III (band) songs
A cappella songs
Cherry Red Records singles
Pete Waterman Entertainment singles
Music videos directed by David Betteridge
Number-one singles in Greece
Songs written by Edward Barton (musician)